Clogherbog is a townland in County Fermanagh, Northern Ireland. It is part of the civil parish of Boho, and contains the sub-townlands of Carrickrory, Lough Nacloyduff, Loughanquin, Loughnamanfin and Tullylaur. It is situated within Fermanagh and Omagh district.

The area is notable for the discovered remnants of ancient civilisations, including an Iron Age wooden cauldron and the lettered cave at Lough Nacloyduff (the lake of the dark caverns), which contains primitive inscriptions. The origins of this cave have been speculated on since a visit by William Wakeman in 1850.

Other features include the Mass rock which is inscribed with the date of 1777 and the Lake of the Fair Woman which is the subject of an old tale.

See also 
 List of townlands in County Fermanagh

References 

Townlands of County Fermanagh
Fermanagh and Omagh district